Enochsburg is an unincorporated community in Whitewater Township, Franklin County, Indiana.

History
Enochsburg (historically called Enochburg and Enochsburgh) was platted in 1836, and named for its founder Enoch Abrahams.

A post office was established at Enochsburg in 1837, and remained in operation until it was discontinued in 1906.

References

Unincorporated communities in Franklin County, Indiana
Unincorporated communities in Indiana